Im Gyeong-sun (born 1929) is a South Korean alpine skier. He competed in three events at the 1960 Winter Olympics.

References

External links
 

1929 births
Living people
South Korean male alpine skiers
Olympic alpine skiers of South Korea
Alpine skiers at the 1960 Winter Olympics
Place of birth missing (living people)
20th-century South Korean people